The 1970 Omani coup d'état was the overthrow of Sultan of Oman Said bin Taimur by his son Qaboos bin Said in Oman on 23 July 1970. Occurring in the midst of the Dhofar Rebellion, the palace coup was executed with the support of the British and saw Sultan Said bin Taimur deposed and sent into exile to the United Kingdom. The coup was a pivotal moment in modern Omani history as Qaboos swiftly set in motion numerous wide-ranging modernization reforms in the kingdom, transforming Oman from an underdeveloped backwater into a country on par with many Western nations in terms of political stability and economic development. At the time of his death in January 2020, Sultan Qaboos was the longest-serving ruler in the Middle East.

Background

Beginning at the end of the 19th century, Oman gradually came under the influence of the British Empire through a series of treaties and diplomatic arrangements. Eventually, the Omani Sultan became increasingly reliant on Britain for support and advice. The Sultanate's primary sources of revenue, notably the slave trade and arms dealing, were prohibited by the British, resulting in confrontations between the Omani authorities and tribesmen in the country's interior. These confrontations led to Oman seeking military support from the British who agreed to defend Sultan Faisal bin Turki from attempts at overthrowing him.

In 1913, Sultan Taimur bin Feisal took the reins of Oman and brought back the kingdom to a more stable financial footing and quelled tribal unrest in the country. He ruled until his abdication in 1932 at which point his eldest son, Said bin Taimur, took over as Sultan.

Under Sultan Said bin Taimur's rule, Oman became increasingly isolationist and underdeveloped. Internal unrest flourished such as in the case of the Jebel Akhdar War and Dhofar Rebellion. Sultan bin Taimur became increasingly reliant on the British to maintain control in his own country, which he refused to rule in a modern manner, at one point refusing to even leave his palace after an assassination attempt. The Dhofar Rebellion was a communist insurgency launched in 1963 and had gripped the country since then, pitting British-led Omani troops against the insurgents primarily in the southern part of the country. The Sultan's Armed Forces (SAF) were under de facto British command. British Colonel Hugh Oldman commanded the Sultan's troops in Muscat, while Brigadier John Graham was the overall commander of the SAF. By 1970, all of the country's only major source of revenue, petrodollars, was either going to fighting insurgents or directly into the sultan's coffers. Sultan bin Taimur's poor leadership of the country and overreliance on British military support aggravated the British government, who began to view Taimur's deposition as the only viable way to defeating Oman's growing communist insurgency. British officials contacted the Sultan's son, Qaboos bin Said al Said, who was under house arrest per his father's orders, by placing voice messages in musical cassette tapes and informed him of the plan the government was concocting to topple his father. Qaboos agreed and the operation proceeded.

Coup

On 23 July 1970, Qaboos bin Said al Said, the Sultan's 29-year-old son and graduate of Sandhurst, purportedly informed British commanders of his intent to overthrow his father. However, planning for the coup had already been in motion for several weeks before that and British-led military units were being put into position to topple the Sultan. Graham convened the top Arab commanders of the Desert Regiment, the main Omani unit that would carry out the coup, and informed them of the letter sent to them by Qaboos which "commanded" the British officers to carry out the coup. The meeting secured their loyalty and cooperation.

The troops arrived at the al-Husn palace in Salalah, Oman and met no resistance. The tribal sheikh of the five hundred guardsmen entrusted to defend the palace's exterior had been persuaded by the British to order his men to stand down prior to the coup.  The remainder of the coup was carried out predominantly by Arab troops in order to mask the extent of the involvement of the British in the operation. During the coup, Said bin Taimur shot Sheikh Braik Al Ghafri, a coup plotter and son of a prominent Omani governor in the stomach before accidentally shooting himself in the foot as he cocked his pistol. Said bin Taimur managed to briefly escape with a few confidantes and bodyguards down a series of hidden passageways and tunnels but was recaptured quickly. The wounded sultan urged his adviser to send an urgent message to Oldman informing him of the events that had transpired, which Oldman being a coup planner ignored. The coup ended when Said bin Taimur signed a document of abdication, handing over the reins of the country to his son, Qaboos. Bin Taimur was flown out of the country on a RAF Bristol Britannia first to Bahrain for medical treatment and then on to London where he lived the remaining two years of his life in a suite in The Dorchester, a luxury hotel.

Aftermath

Sultan Qaboos bin Said al Said immediately set on his priorities of modernizing the country and defeating the insurgency in the newly renamed Sultanate of Oman's interior. Prior to taking the throne, Oman had no secondary schools, only one hospital, and ten kilometers of paved roads. He redirected the country's oil revenue to economic initiatives, moving the country away from subsistence farming and fishing, and building modern infrastructure. Schools were built, the country was electrified, numerous roads were built, and Western journalists ceased labeling the country as "medieval". Slavery was abolished, and by 1975 the insurgency in the country had been suppressed in an international effort. By 1980, Oman had 28 hospitals, 363 schools, and 12,000 kilometers of paved roads. In addition, the Majlis Al-Shura was established which has the power to review legislation and call government ministers to meet with them. Internal unrest in Oman has successfully ended owing to an initiative by Qaboos to include all ethnic and tribal groups into the administration of the country and granting amnesty for former rebels. Bin Taimur died in 1972 in London and Sultan Qaboos ruled Oman until his death in 2020.

The success of the Dhofar Rebellion which was proving to be a formidable challenge for Oman was reversed with the removal of Taimur. Qaboos launched a concerted £400 million effort to modernize the Omani military, even founding a navy to protect the country's oil exports. The communist rebels gradually lost their foreign support bases in the Soviet Union and China after a string of military defeats. This, coupled with mounting international opposition to the rebellion including the deployment of Iranian troops in 1973 led to a final defeat of the rebels in 1975.

The involvement of the British government as a whole in the coup was denied for forty years with the official government narrative being the coup was carried out predominantly by Arab troops with their British commanders taking part on personal initiative. In fact, the coup had been planned by MI6, the Foreign Office, and the Ministry of Defence and given the go-ahead by prime minister Edward Heath. Contingency planning of the event showed that Qaboos would have been kept under the protection of British troops then flown out of the country should the coup have failed.

References 

Coup d'etat
1970s coups d'état and coup attempts
July 1970 events in Asia
1970 in Oman
Oman–United Kingdom relations